The 1987 Irish general election to the 25th Dáil was held on Tuesday, 17 February, four weeks after the dissolution of the 24th Dáil on 20 January by President Patrick Hillery, on the request of Taoiseach Garret FitzGerald. A continuing crisis over public finance and a rejection of the budget had led to the Labour Party withdrawing from the Fine Gael–led coalition government. The general election took place in 41 Dáil constituencies throughout Ireland for 166 seats in Dáil Éireann, the house of representatives of the Oireachtas. There were minor amendments to constituency boundaries under the Electoral (Amendment) Act 1983.

The 25th Dáil met at Leinster House on 10 March to nominate the Taoiseach for appointment by the president and to approve the appointment of a new government of Ireland. Charles Haughey was appointed Taoiseach, forming the 20th Government of Ireland, a minority single-party Fianna Fáil government.

Campaign
The 1987 general election was precipitated by the withdrawal of the Labour Party from the Fine Gael–led government on 20 January 1987. The reason was a disagreement over budget proposals. Rather than attempt to press on with the government's agenda, the Taoiseach and leader of Fine Gael, Garret FitzGerald, sought a dissolution of the Dáil. An unusually long period of four weeks was set for the campaign.

Fianna Fáil's campaign involved a refusal to make any definite commitments; however, it attempted to convince the electorate that the country would be better under Fianna Fáil. Charles Haughey's attitudes toward Northern Ireland and the Anglo-Irish Agreement were both attacked. However, the campaign was mostly fought on economic issues.

The Labour Party decided against any pre-election pact, particularly with Fine Gael. The Progressive Democrats (PD), founded only two years earlier, surpassed Labour as the third-biggest political party in the Dáil. Although the majority of the PD party consisted of Fianna Fáil defectors, it mainly took seats from Fine Gael.

Results

|}
Notes
 Independents include Independent Fianna Fáil (7,720 votes, 1 seat) and the Tax Reform League (3,832 votes).
 Changes in numbers of seats for each party are shown relative to the previous election in November 1982.

Although opinion polls had suggested otherwise, Fianna Fáil once again failed to win an overall majority. The Progressive Democrats did exceptionally well in their first general election, becoming the third-biggest party in the Dáil. Fine Gael lost many seats, mostly to the PDs. The Labour Party fell to its lowest share of the vote since 1933, but managed to salvage 12 seats, more than expected, including that of its leader Dick Spring, who saved his seat by just four votes.

Voting summary

Seats summary

Government formation
Fianna Fáil formed the 20th Government of Ireland, a minority government, with Charles Haughey returning as Taoiseach. Haughey was nominated as Taoiseach with the votes of his own party, the support of Independent Fianna Fáil TD Neil Blaney and the abstention of Independent TD Tony Gregory. That left him with just half of votes cast. Ceann Comhairle Seán Treacy exercised his casting vote in favour of the nomination of Haughey. The Fianna Fáil government of 1987 to 1989 was the last time to date that a government composed only of members of one party has been formed in Ireland.

Dáil membership changes 
The following changes took place at the election:
 17 outgoing TDs retired
 1 vacant seat at election time
 147 outgoing TDs stood for re-election (also Tom Fitzpatrick, the outgoing Ceann Comhairle, who was automatically returned)
 127 of those were re-elected
 20 failed to be re-elected
 38 successor TDs were elected
 32 were elected for the first time
 6 had previously been TDs
 There were 6 successor female TDs, with the total remaining unchanged at 14
 There were changes in 32 of the 41 constituencies contested

Where more than one change took place in a constituency, the concept of successor is an approximation for presentation only.

See also
Members of the 18th Seanad

Notes

References

Further reading

External links
1987 election: Party leaders' debate RTÉ archives

1987 elections in the Republic of Ireland
1987 in Irish politics
1987
25th Dáil
February 1987 events in Europe